The 1943 football season was São Paulo's 14th season since the club's founding in 1930.

Overall

{|class="wikitable"
|-
|Games played || 43 (20 Campeonato Paulista, 23 Friendly match)
|-
|Games won || 31 (15 Campeonato Paulista, 16 Friendly match)
|-
|Games drawn || 7 (3 Campeonato Paulista, 4 Friendly match)
|-
|Games lost || 5 (2 Campeonato Paulista, 3 Friendly match)
|-
|Goals scored || 136
|-
|Goals conceded || 44
|-
|Goal difference || +92
|-
|Best result || 10–0 (A) v Olímpico - Friendly match - 1943.11.14
|-
|Worst result || 1–3 (A) v Fluminense - Friendly match - 1943.04.21
|-
|Most appearances || 
|-
|Top scorer || 
|-

Friendlies

Official competitions

Campeonato Paulista

Record

External links
official website 

Association football clubs 1943 season
1943
1943 in Brazilian football